Asmatullah Rohani (August 3, 1937 – September 24, 2017) was an Afghan judge, educator and activist for human rights, democracy, and social justice.

Background 
Rohani was born in Afghanistan, his father Hamdullah a judge in Northern Mazar-e Sharif province.  Their family was part of the Yousufzia tribe in Eastern Kunar Province.

Rohani completed his primary education at Shiah Koat Ahdad primary school in Nangarhar province.  In 1950, he was admitted to Madrassah Imam Abu Hanifa in Kabul. Rohandi graduated in 1957, then got his BA in 1961 from faculty of Islamic law at Kabul University.

In 1972, Rohani went to Australia on a scholarship to study international law and later in 1976 he went to Japan for further studies.

Professional career
After completing his studies overseas, Rohani returned to Afghanistan and served as Supreme Court ( Pashto: ستره محكمه) judge at the Ministry of Justice in Kabul.  Later he was appointed as the director of the Supreme Court (Pashto: ستره محكمه) judge to Paktika province.  He also taught part-time at the faculty of Islamic law in Kabul University.

In 1980, Rohani joined the National Committee for Human Rights.  He documented human rights abuses and atrocities committed by the Nur Muhammad Taraki regime and Soviet Armed Forces against the civilian population of Afghanistan.  In 1987, Rohani was hospitalized in Kabul after a failed assassination attempt.

Soon after the attack, Rohani and his wife fled the country, crossing a remote mountain by foot to Pakistan.  They joined their children who were already living in Peshawar, Pakistan.  Mr. Rohani joined the Writers of Union of Free Afghanistan and wrote a book about his experiences.

In 1988, the U.S. Government invited Rohani to visit the United States. In Washington D.C., he met with several members of the US Congress to discuss the future of Afghanistan.  Rohani was also invited to Voice of America for a special session on Afghanistan.

After returning to Peshawar, Rohani was appointed as director of the free lawyers of association of Afghanistan. In May 1991, the South Korean government invited him to visit their country, where he participated in the Second Conference of the Presidents of Bar Association in Asia.  He had several interviews with Korean television, where he discussed the need for helping the Afghan people after the Soviet troop withdrawal.

In 1994, Rohani joined his children in Canada. He completed and published two more books in Pashto language called Rohani Palwashi and Rohani Salghai.

Rohani died in Guelph, Ontario, on September 24, 2017.

Published books
 Rohani Selgie - (روحاني سلگی)
 Rohani Palwashi - (روحانی پلوشې)
 Rohani Rana aw Manawi Shkula - (روحانی رڼا او معنوی ښکلا)
 Jihad Fi Sabilillah - (جہاد فی سبیل اللہ)

References

http://www.scprd.com/lekane/show.php?sid=779

https://web.archive.org/web/20110727204458/http://puka.cs.waikato.ac.nz/cgi-bin/library?e=d-00000-00---off-0acku--00-0----0-10-0---0---0direct-10---4-------0-1l--11-en-50---20-about---00-0-1-00-0-0-11-1-0utfZz-8-00&a=d&c=acku&cl=CL3.68.25&d=HASH0118eefbba7632feff18a6e4

External links
 Da Leekwalo Leekane | SCPRD.COM  قاضي عصمت الله روحاني
 Da Leekwalo Leekane | SCPRD.COM  قاضي عصمت الله روحاني
 http://www.pashtoonkhwa.com/?page=pashtoonkhwa&id=157  قاضي عصمت الله روحاني
 http://wepakhtoons.blogspot.com/2010/07/poem-life-of-pakhtoons.html  قاضي عصمت الله روحاني
Guelph Public Library
Asmatullah Rohani books:

https://catalog.guelphpl.ca/polaris/search/searchresults.aspx?ctx=1.1033.0.0.5&type=Keyword&term=Asmatullah%20rohani&by=KW&sort=RELEVANCE&limit=TOM=*&query=&page=0&searchid=1

Afghan judges
1937 births
2017 deaths